Kalidas Karmakar (10 January 1946 – 18 October 2019) was a Bangladeshi artist. He specialized in viscosity printing. He was awarded Shilpakala Padak (2016) and the Ekushey Padak (2018) by the Government of Bangladesh for his contribution to fine arts.

Early life
Karmakar completed a two-year pre-degree course at Institute of Fine Arts at the University of Dhaka. In 1969, he later graduated from Government College of Art & Craft in Kolkata. His first ever-major solo exhibition was held at Bangladesh Shilpakala Academy Gallery in August 1976. He worked with the English painter Stanley William Hayter.

He died on 18 October 2019 at the age of 73.

Awards
 Sultan Gold Award (2015)
 Shilpakala Padak (2016)
 Ekushey Padak (2018)

References

External links
 
 

1946 births
2019 deaths
People from Faridpur District
Bangladeshi painters
University of Dhaka Faculty of Fine Arts alumni
Recipients of the Ekushey Padak